Scandinavian Western Shooters (SWS), founded 1 October 1997, is the Norwegian association for cowboy action shooting under the Single Action Shooting Society. The association seeks to promote safe shooting competitions incorporating facts and fiction from the "old west", creating a romantic and nostalgic atmosphere. The firearms used are models produced before 1900, as well as replicas of those, and all competitors compete using cowboy nicknames and dressed up in cowboy themed clothing.

Cowboy action shooting in Norway emerged towards the end of the 1990s with the first CAS club being founded in 1997 under the name "1873-klubben Western Lawdogs". The founders of Western Lawdogs later also took initiative to form the SWS as a nationwide sports association.

See also 
 List of shooting sports organizations

Other shooting sport organizations in Norway 
 Det frivillige Skyttervesen
 Norwegian Shooting Association
 Dynamic Sports Shooting Norway
 Norwegian Association of Hunters and Anglers
 Norwegian Benchrest Shooting Association
 Norwegian Black Powder Union
 Norwegian Biathlon Association
 Norwegian Metal Silhouette Association

References 

1997 establishments in Norway
Sports organisations of Norway